Miles O'Connor (born 20 April 1982 in Mississauga, Ontario) is a Canadian soccer player who plays for AAC of Toronto.

Career 
He previously played for Italia Shooters, Brampton Lions and in Belgium for RRFC Montegnée.

International 
He is a former member of the Canada U-20 men's national soccer team and scored in 6 games, one goal.

Coaching 
O'Connor leads Step Up Soccer Summer Camp in Mississauga, which coached youth talents and the U-18 B of Mississauga SC.

His brother Matthew O'Connor also plays football.

References 

1982 births
Living people
Brampton United players
Association football midfielders
Canada men's youth international soccer players
Canadian expatriate soccer players
Canadian people of Irish descent
Canadian soccer players
R.R.F.C. Montegnée players
Soccer players from Mississauga
York Region Shooters players